Mullah Abdul Razzaq, a Durrani Pashtun from Kandahar, Afghanistan, was former minister of the interior for the Taliban, and the governor of Herat.

He was in command of the Taliban forces when they captured Kabul and is accused of personally ordering the execution of former President of Afghanistan Mohammad Najibullah. He was captured in the Mazar uprising but was able to escape.

References

Taliban government ministers of Afghanistan
People from Kandahar
Living people
Pashtun people
Year of birth missing (living people)